Edward Livingston Taylor Jr. (August 10, 1869 – March 10, 1938) was an American lawyer and politician who served four terms as a U.S. Representative from Ohio from 1905 to 1913.

Biography 
Born in Columbus, Ohio, he was the son of Edward (Sr,) and Kathryn (Myers) Taylor. Edward Sr. was the son of David Taylor, the founder of Truro Township and his wife Margaret Livingston, related to the Livingston and Schuyler families of New York.

Taylor attended public school and graduated from the Columbus High School. He went on to study law. He married Marie Firestone Taylor.
He was admitted to the bar in 1891 and commenced practice in Columbus.
He served as prosecuting attorney of Franklin County 1899–1904.

Congress 
Taylor was elected as a Republican to the Fifty-ninth and to the three succeeding Congresses (March 4, 1905 – March 4, 1913).
He was an unsuccessful candidate for reelection in 1912 to the Sixty-third Congress.

Personal life
He continued the practice of law in Columbus, Ohio, until his death of throat and larynx cancer on March 10, 1938, at his modest home on Granville Street in the Woodland Park neighborhood of Columbus.
He was interred in Greenlawn Cemetery, Columbus, Ohio.

Taylor married Marie Agnes Firestone of Columbus on January 4, 1894. She was the daughter of Clinton D. Firestone, president of the Columbus Buggy Company, a carriage and vehicle factory and early automobile manufacturer.

References

Sources

1869 births
1938 deaths
American people of Dutch descent
American people of Scottish descent
Politicians from Columbus, Ohio
County district attorneys in Ohio
Ohio lawyers
Burials at Green Lawn Cemetery (Columbus, Ohio)
Lawyers from Columbus, Ohio
Livingston family
Schuyler family
Republican Party members of the United States House of Representatives from Ohio